Baeckea pachyphylla is a species of flowering plant in the family Myrtaceae and is endemic to the south of Western Australia. It is a shrub with bilaterally flattened leaves and small white flowers with two to eight stamens.

Description

Taxonomy
Baeckea pachyphylla was first formally described in 1867 by George Bentham in the Flora Australiensis from specimens collected by George Maxwell. The specific epithet (pachyphylla) means "thick-leaved".

In 2021, Barbara Lynette Rye changed the name to Austrobaeckea pachyphylla, but the name has not yet been accepted by the Australian Plant Census.

Distribution and habitat
This baeckea is found on sand plains and gentle slopes, often with mallees, in the Great Southern and south western coastal parts of Goldfields-Esperance region of Western Australia where it grows in sandy, clay and loamy soils around granite.

See also
List of Baeckea species

References

Flora of Western Australia
pachyphylla
Plants described in 1867
Taxa named by George Bentham